The members of the National Assembly of Zambia from 1991 until 1996 were elected on 31 October 1991. Of the 150 elected members, 125 were from the Movement for Multi-Party Democracy and 25 from the United National Independence Party.

List of members

Elected members

Replacements by by-election

Non-elected members

References

1991